The Royal Caribbean Golf Classic was a golf tournament on the Champions Tour from 1987 to 2004. It was played in late January/early February in Key Biscayne, Florida at the Crandon Park Golf Club (1997–2004) and at The Links at Key Biscayne (1987–1996). It was played using the tradition stroke play format except in 2000 and 2001 when it used the Modified Stableford scoring system.

The purse for the 2004 tournament was US$1,450,000, with $217,500 going to the winner. The tournament was founded in 1987 as the Gus Machado Senior Classic.

At the 1998 Royal Caribbean Classic, David Graham defeated Dave Stockton on the tenth hole of a sudden-death playoff. It was the longest sudden-death playoff in Champions Tour history.

Winners
 2004 Bruce Fleisher
 2003 Dave Barr

Royal Caribbean Classic
 2002 John Jacobs
 2001 Larry Nelson
 2000 Bruce Fleisher
 1999 Bruce Fleisher
 1998 David Graham
 1997 Gibby Gilbert
 1996 Bob Murphy
 1995 J. C. Snead
 1994 Lee Trevino
 1993 Jim Colbert
 1992 Don Massengale
 1991 Gary Player
 1990 Lee Trevino

Gus Machado Senior Classic
 1989 No tournament
 1988 Lee Elder
 1987 Gene Littler

Source:

References

External links
 Tournament results (1990-2004) at GolfObserver.com

Former PGA Tour Champions events
Golf in Florida
Sports in Miami-Dade County, Florida
Recurring sporting events established in 1987
Recurring sporting events disestablished in 2004
1987 establishments in Florida
2004 disestablishments in Florida